Actinonin is a naturally occurring antibacterial agent that has demonstrated anti-tumor activity.

Actiononin has been shown to inhibit the enzyme peptide deformylase, which is essential in prokaryotes.

References

Hydroxamic acids